Just Rambling Along is a 1918 American short silent comedy film featuring Stan Laurel. The film is Laurel's earliest surviving work and the first project he did with film producer Hal Roach, who later put out a large portion of the Laurel and Hardy films.

Plot
The story is of a poor young sap who can't seem to get a break. He's thrown out of a diner, and then finds a wallet, which is immediately snatched away from him by a little boy.  Stan tries to fight the boy for it, but the boy's father, a police officer, stops him. Stan gives up and walks away.

Next the Pretty Young Lady (Mildred Reardon) woos him and a park bench full of men back into the diner.  When the hostess sees Stan, she kicks him out on his rear end.  Out on the street, he finds the little boy playing with the wallet.  He quickly snatches it away and goes back into the diner.  When the hostess tries to throw him out a third time, he shows her that he has money to pay for a meal.  Before going to the serving line, he pauses to flirt with the pretty young lady, who promptly throws a drink in his face.

He then goes up to the serving line where the chef gives him a taste of everything he has to offer that day.  Stan stuffs his face, but shakes his head and tells the chef that he doesn't want any of it.  He only wants a cup of coffee.  When the chef has his back turned, Stan stuffs his pockets and boater full of food.

He goes back to the pretty young lady's table, sits down, and tries to flirt with her once again.  While he's eating, she switches their tickets, and gets up to leave.  He follows her to the cashier and realizes he's left with her bill, which he cannot pay.  He tries to sneak out of the diner, but he's caught and thrown out on his rear for the third and final time.  The film ends with the cop roughing him up as the young boy looks on.

Cast
 Stan Laurel as Nervy Young Man
 Clarine Seymour as Pretty Lady
 Noah Young as Policeman
 James Parrott as Cook
 Bud Jamison as Chef
 Harry Clifton
 Wallace Howe
 Belle Mitchell
 Marie Mosquini
 Dorothea Wolbert

See also
 List of American films of 1918

References

External links

 

1918 films
1918 comedy films
1918 short films
Silent American comedy films
American silent short films
American black-and-white films
Films directed by Hal Roach
1910s American films
1910s English-language films
American comedy short films